Burrell Carver Smith (born December 16, 1955) is a retired American computer engineer who, while working at Apple Computer, designed the motherboard (digital circuit board) for the original Macintosh. He was Apple employee #282, and was hired in February 1979, initially as an Apple II service technician. He also designed the motherboard for Apple's LaserWriter.

Smith was working in Apple's service department when he helped Bill Atkinson add more memory to an Apple II computer in an innovative fashion. Atkinson recommended him to Jef Raskin, who, along with Steve Wozniak, was looking for a hardware engineer to help them with their newly formed Macintosh project. As a member of the design team, Smith designed five different motherboards during the course of Macintosh development, all of which used techniques based on Programmable Array Logic (PAL) chips to achieve maximum functionality with a minimal chip count and cost. His signature is molded into the case of the original Macintosh 128K computers.

Smith left the company before releasing Apple's "Turbo Mac" design platform, which included an internal hard drive and a further simplified chipset.

He was later a co-founder of Radius Inc.

Personal life
Smith is retired and lives in Palo Alto.

He reportedly had bipolar disorder during the 1990s. In 1993, he was accused of "breaking windows, throwing a firecracker and leaving letters at the house" of Steve Jobs; the case was dropped when he accepted treatment. Actor Lenny Jacobson portrayed him in the 2013 film Jobs.

References

External links
Revolution in the Valley Andy Hertzfeld's book about the development of the Macintosh.
Folklore.org stories about Burrell Smith, stories of Smith's contributions written by other Macintosh team members

Living people
Apple Inc. employees
1955 births